The 28 cm SK L/50 was a German naval gun that was used in World War I and World War II. Originally a naval gun, it was adapted for land service after World War I.

Description
It used the Krupp horizontal sliding-block, or "wedge", as it is sometimes referred to, breech design rather than the interrupted screw used commonly used in heavy guns of other nations. This required that the propellant charge be loaded in a metal, usually brass, case which provides obturation i.e. seals the breech to prevent escape of the expanding propellant gas.

Coast defense guns

A C/37 Coastal Mounting was utilised for coastal guns. Battery Coronel at Borkum, Germany mounted  four guns and Battery Grosser Kurfürst at Framzelle, France mounted four.

See also
 List of naval guns

Footnotes
Notes

Citations

References

External links

 SK L/50 at Navweaps.com

280 mm artillery
Naval guns of Germany
Coastal artillery